Irene Craigmile Bolam (born Irene Madalaine O'Crowley; October 1, 1904 – July 7, 1982) was an American banker and resident of Monroe Township, Middlesex County, New Jersey. In 1970, a book that was soon widely discredited set forth an allegation that she was Amelia Earhart. Bolam denied the claim and took legal action against the publisher, resulting in the book being withdrawn.

Amelia Earhart theory
In 1965, Joseph Gervais was invited to speak at a gathering of retired pilots where he was introduced to Mrs. Bolam by one of Amelia Earhart's friends, Viola Gentry. Gervais felt he instantly recognized her as an older version of Amelia Earhart, and commenced to research her past. Using Gervais' research, author Joe Klaas documented his assertion in his book Amelia Earhart Lives (1970). Bolam denied being Earhart, filed a $1.5 million lawsuit and submitted a lengthy affidavit refuting the claim. The book's publisher McGraw-Hill pulled Klaas' book from the market shortly after it was released and court records indicate they made an out of court settlement with her.
Bolam's personal life history has since been thoroughly documented, eliminating any possibility she was Earhart. Evidence presented in the affidavit included her 1937 private pilot's license and marriage certificate. Her personal life was also a matter of public record. Born Irene Madalaine O'Crowley, she married Charles Craigmile and after his death in 1931, she married Alvin Heller in 1933. The two had a son in 1934 named Clarence Alvin Heller, but their marriage was annulled in 1940. She remarried to Guy Bolam in 1958. Although Irene Craigmile Bolam was briefly a pilot who claimed to have known Amelia Earhart, her main career from the mid-1940s on revolved around banking and finance in New York. Many mutual friends such as air racer Elinor Smith also knew both Earhart and Bolam. 

On Bolam's death, Gervais sought permission to photograph and fingerprint the body, but permission was denied. In 2006, a criminal forensic expert was hired by National Geographic to study photographs of Earhart and Bolam and cited many measurable facial differences between them, concluding that the two people were not the same.

After Amelia Earhart Lives was published in 1970, three additional books were subsequently published that continued to proclaim Mrs. Bolam and Amelia Earhart had physically been one and the same human being. The authors of these books continued to promote the theory that Bolam and Earhart were one and the same, despite the aforementioned facts and circumstances.

References

Notes

Bibliography

 Glines, C.V. "'Lady Lindy': The Remarkable Life of Amelia Earhart." Aviation History, July 1997. 
 Goldstein, Donald M. and Katherine V. Dillon.  Amelia: The Centennial Biography of an Aviation Pioneer. Washington, DC: Brassey's, 1997. .
 Hoverstein, Paul. "An American Obsession". Air & Space Smithsonian, Vol. 22, No. 2, June/July 2007.
 Klaas, Joe. Amelia Earhart Lives. New York: McGraw–Hill Book Co., 1970. .
 Strippel, Richard G. Amelia Earhart: The Myth and the Reality. New York: Exposition Press, 1972. .
 Strippel, Richard G. "Researching Amelia: A Detailed Summary for the Serious Researcher into the Disappearance of Amelia Earhart." Air Classics, Vol. 31, No. 11, November 1995.

External links
 
 
 

1904 births
1982 deaths
People from Monroe Township, Middlesex County, New Jersey
American bankers
Amelia Earhart
American women bankers
20th-century American businesspeople
20th-century American businesswomen